Sherman L. Fleek is an American military historian.  He was born at Hill Air Force Base and raised in Layton, Utah.  His work specializes on Mormon military history, particularly the history of the Mormon Battalion during the Mexican–American War. He has also written on topics related to Latter-day Saint (LDS) history that are not always military in nature.

Career
Fleek rose to the rank of Lieutenant Colonel in the United States Army, serving as an aviator, Special Forces officer, and historian in several command and staff positions. His last duty in the Army was chief historian for the National Guard Bureau in Washington D.C., before retiring in 2002. In 2005, during his service as a historian for a Civil War non-profit preservation foundation in the Shenandoah Valley in Virginia, the Army approached Fleek to enter federal civil service and become the official command historian for the United States Army reconstruction effort in Iraq. Fleek deployed to Iraq for four months in 2006, and followed that by serving as command historian of Walter Reed Army Medical Center from 2007 to 2009. In May 2009, he assumed the position as historian for the United States Military Academy at West Point.

Fleek received a bachelor's degree in English from Brigham Young University in 1982, and a master's degree in history from the University of Colorado at Colorado Springs while serving in the Army at Fort Carson. He is a Latter-day Saint and served an LDS mission in the Idaho Pocatello Mission from 1977 to 1979, after completing four years in Germany as an enlisted soldier with the Army from 1973 to 1977.

Works
Books by Fleek include History May Be Searched in Vain: A Military History of the Mormon Battalion (414 pages, Arthur H. Clark Company) which won the Utah State History Society Amy Price Military History Award for 2007. He also wrote, Place the Headstones Where They Belong : Thomas Neibaur, WWI Soldier (Logan: Utah State University Press).  Fleek has contributed many articles to Military History, America's Civil War, Wild West, Army, and Mormon Heritage Magazine.

Fleek has also wrote two historical fiction novels that focus on the Mormon Battalion and General Stephen Kearny's Army of the West during the Mexican War. The first is Called to War: Dawn of the Mormon Battalion (2010) and a sequel War in the Far West: the March of the Mormon Battalion, (2011).

In November 2011, publisher Greg Kofford Books released Saints of Valor: Mormon Medal of Honor Recipients that details the stories of Latter-day Saints who have received the Medal of Honor.

In March 2023, Fleek's magnus opus was published by the University of Kansas Press, The Mormon Military Experience: 1838 to the Cold War. This book was twelve years in the writing and review process. Robert Freeman Professor of Religion and Church History at Brigham Young University is the co-author who joined with Sherman Fleek in 2011 to produce this book. The book is a comprehensive history of the LDS Church's military involvement and its unique role in American military history.

Valor Award
Sherman Fleek was awarded the U.S. Army's highest civilian decoration for bravery on May 25, 2016, by Secretary of the Army Eric K. Fanning. On May 31, 2015, while on vacation in California, Fleek was waiting to be seated at an IHOP restaurant when an armed robber entered and demanded all the money from the cashier. In a few seconds Sherman Fleek decided to rush the gunman from behind from his position in the waiting area. With no weapon, Fleek struck the armed man and knocked him across the cashier counter, then a struggle for the pistol ensued. At one point the assailant pointed the pistol at Fleek's chest. Struggling to gain control of the weapon the gunman eventually broke free and escaped with the pistol. Months later army officials at the U.S. Military Academy nominated Fleek for the Secretary of the Army Award for Valor, which was approved in the spring of 2016 and presented to him at The Pentagon in a special ceremony.

The Award Citation 

For heroic achievement on 31 May 2015 Mr. Sherman L. Fleek was on leave visiting a restaurant when he witnessed an armed robbery in progress. Without hesitation, he tackled and fought a man robbing the cashier at gunpoint and forced the robber to flee. His actions, which saved the lives of countless patrons and employees, exemplify the Army values of duty, selfless service, and personal courage.

Awards and decorations

Bibliography
Non-fiction:
History May be Searched in Vain: A Military History of the Mormon Battalion, Spokane, Washington: Arthur H. Clark Company,2006. , 
Place the Headstones Where They Belong : Thomas Neibaur, WWI Soldier (Logan: Utah State University Press) 
Saints of Valor: Mormon Medal of Honor Recipients Greg Kofford Books, 2011. 
The Mormon Military Experience: 1838 to the Cold War, (Lawrence: University of Kansas Press) 2023. 

Novels:
Called to War: Dawn of the Mormon Battalion (2010) 
War in the Far West: the March of the Mormon Battalion, (2011).

See also 
 Mormon Battalion

Sources 

 BYU Magazine Spring 2007
 this article by Kenneth Godfrey contains a reference to an article by Fleek in the footnote
  BYU Conference to Salute LDS Veterans Mormon Times, Nov 3, 2011
 10 "Mormons among Medal of Honor Recipients", Mormon Times, May 24, 2012
  https://www.army.mil/article/168629/Soldiers__civilian_employees_earn_SecArmy_awards/, 26 May 2016.

Year of birth missing (living people)
Living people
Latter Day Saints from Utah
Brigham Young University alumni
American Master Army Aviators
University of Colorado Colorado Springs alumni
People from Layton, Utah
American military historians
American male non-fiction writers